Trimerodytes aequifasciatus, the  Asiatic annulate keelback or Asiatic water snake, is a species of snake in the family Colubridae. It is found in Laos, southern China, Hong Kong. and Vietnam.

References 

Trimerodytes
Snakes of Asia
Snakes of China
Reptiles of Hong Kong
Reptiles of Laos
Snakes of Vietnam
Reptiles described in 1908
Taxa named by Thomas Barbour